The 35th Canadian Parliament was in session from January 17, 1994, until April 27, 1997.  The membership was set by the 1993 federal election on October 25, 1993, and it changed only somewhat due to resignations and by-elections until it was dissolved prior to the 1997 election.

It was controlled by a Liberal Party majority under Prime Minister Jean Chrétien and the 26th Canadian Ministry.  The Official Opposition was the Bloc Québécois, led first by Lucien Bouchard, then by Michel Gauthier, and finally by Gilles Duceppe.

The Speaker was Gilbert Parent.  See also list of Canadian electoral districts 1987–96 for a list of the ridings in this parliament.

There were two sessions of the 35th Parliament:

Party standings

The party standings as of the election and as of dissolution were as follows:

Members of the House of Commons
Members of the House of Commons in the 35th parliament arranged by province.

Newfoundland

* Brian Tobin left parliament in 1996 to become premier of Newfoundland; Gerry Byrne was elected  to replace him in a by-election.

Prince Edward Island

Nova Scotia

New Brunswick

Quebec

* Gaston Péloquin died in a car accident in 1994, and was replaced by Denis Paradis in a by-election on February 13, 1995.
** Lucien Bouchard left parliament in 1995 to become premier of Quebec; Stéphan Tremblay is elected to replace him in a by-election.
*** Nic Leblanc left the Bloc Québécois and sat as an "independent sovereigntist" on March 17, 1997.
**** Bernard St-Laurent left the Bloc Québécois and sat as an Independent on March 5, 1997.
***** André Ouellet was appointed head of Canada Post, and was replaced by Pierre Pettigrew in a by-election on March 25, 1996.
****** David Berger was appointed Canadian Ambassador to Israel and high commissioner to Cyprus in 1994, and was replaced by Lucienne Robillard in a by-election on February 13, 1995.
******* Shirley Maheu was appointed to the Senate, and was replaced by Stéphane Dion also in a by-election on March 26, 1996.

Ontario

* Dennis Mills quit the Liberal caucus to sit as an Independent Liberal in May 1996, but returned to the party in August of the same year.
** Roy MacLaren was appointed High Commissioner of Canada to the United Kingdom, and his seat was filled by Roy Cullen in a by-election in 1996.
*** Jag Bhaduria was expelled from the Liberal Party for falsifying his credentials.
***** John Nunziata was expelled from the Liberal Party for voting against the 1996 budget on April 16 of that year, and sat for the rest of the session as an Independent.

Manitoba

Saskatchewan

Alberta

* Jan Brown was suspended from the Reform Party, and then quit the party to sit as an Independent Reform member.

British Columbia

Territories

By-elections

References

Succession

 
Canadian parliaments
1994 establishments in Canada
1997 disestablishments in Canada
1994 in Canadian politics
1995 in Canadian politics
1996 in Canadian politics
1997 in Canadian politics
Jean Chrétien